Solon Township is the name of some places in the U.S. state of Michigan:

 Solon Township, Kent County, Michigan
 Solon Township, Leelanau County, Michigan

Michigan township disambiguation pages